SEK (Sidirodromoi Ellinikou Kratous, Hellenic State Railways) Class Λα (or Class La; Lambda-alpha) is a class of forty 2-10-0 steam locomotives purchased in 1926 and 1927 from Lokomotivfabrik der StEG and Škoda Works

They were given the class letters "Λα" and numbers 901 to 940.

References

 http://anno.onb.ac.at/cgi-content/anno-plus?aid=lok&datum=1927&page=9&size=45 
 http://www.manfred-kopka.de/europa/griechen/la.htm 

Λα
2-10-0 locomotives
Steam locomotives of Greece
Railway locomotives introduced in 1925
Standard gauge locomotives of Greece
Škoda locomotives
Lokomotivfabrik der StEG locomotives
1′E h2 locomotives